Justice Draper may refer to:

Floyd Draper, associate justice of the Supreme Court of Indiana
George W. Draper III, judge of the Supreme Court of Missouri